"See visionS" is the tenth single released by the J-pop singer Mami Kawada on February 16, 2011. Its title track was later released on the album Square the Circle. The title track is used as the second opening theme for the second season of the anime series A Certain Magical Index. Overall, this is Kawada's sixth tie-in with said anime series.

The single came in a limited CD+DVD edition (GNCV-0029) and a regular edition (GNCV-0030). The DVD contains the promotional video for "See visionS".

Track listing 
 See visionS
Lyrics: Mami Kawada
Composition/Arrangement: Maiko Iuchi
 Don't interrupt me
Lyrics: Mami Kawada
Composition: Tomoyuki Nakazawa
Arrangement: Tomoyuki Nakazawa, Takeshi Ozaki
 See visionS (instrumental)
 Don't interrupt me (instrumental)
 PSI-Missing -2011 remix-
Lyrics: Mami Kawada
Composition: Tomoyuki Nakazawa
Arrangement: Tomoyuki Nakazawa, Takeshi Ozaki

Charts and sales

2011 singles
Mami Kawada songs
A Certain Magical Index music
Anime songs
Japanese-language songs
Songs with lyrics by Mami Kawada
Song recordings produced by I've Sound